Karl Paul Themistokles von Eckenbrecher (17 November 1842, Athens – 4 December 1921, Goslar) was a German landscape and marine painter, in the late Romantic style.

Biography 
His father was a Prussian military officer, who had originally studied philosophy and medicine. His Italian mother came from a merchant family in Trieste. He was born while his parents were in Greece, visiting his father's friend, Heinrich Schliemann. In 1843, his family returned to Berlin, where he studied at the English-American school. As he got older, he travelled with his father and was taught by private tutors. It was during this time that he developed an interest in ships.

From 1850 to 1857, they lived in Istanbul, then moved to Potsdam, where they lived until 1861. When he expressed his wish to become a marine painter, his parents supported him and, from 1859 to 1860, he was a student of the court painter, . From 1861 to 1867, they lived in Düsseldorf, where he was a private student of Oswald Achenbach. While there, he also became a member of the progressive artists' group known as Malkasten (paintbox).

Despite having married Johanna Stever, the daughter of a landowner from Mecklenburg, in 1875, he was travelling almost continuously; throughout Europe and the Middle East. After a trip to Egypt in 1881, he and his colleague, Wilhelm Simmler, created an Orientalist panorama called "Entry of the Mecca Caravan into Cairo"  (118x15 meters, roughly 387x49 feet) for the city of Hamburg.

In 1892, he went farther afield, visiting the Philippines and German colonies in Africa. He eventually learned how to speak eleven languages.

In 1919, he moved his home base from Berlin to Goslar and died there two years later. A major retrospective and sale of his works was held in 1942. His son, Gustav Heinrich (1876-1935), spent much of his life as a farmer near Okombahe, in what was then South West Africa.

Selected paintings

References

Further reading 
 Biography in: Friedrich von Boetticher: Malerwerke des 19. Jahrhunderts. Beitrag zur Kunstgeschichte, Dresden 1891, pgs. 252–253
 Biography in:  Ulrich Thieme (Ed.): Allgemeines Lexikon der Bildenden Künstler von der Antike bis zur Gegenwart, E. A. Seemann, Leipzig 1914, pgs.318–319
 Siegfried Gehrecke: "Themistokles von Eckenbrecher" (Goslarer Künstler und Kunsthandwerker #4). Museumsverein Goslar, Goslar 1985.
 "Eckenbrecher, Themistokles von". In: Allgemeines Künstlerlexikon. Die Bildenden Künstler aller Zeiten und Völker,  Vol.32, Saur, 2002,  pgs.72–74.

External links 

More works by Von Eckenbrecher @ ArtNet
 

1842 births
1921 deaths
20th-century German painters
20th-century German male artists
German landscape painters
Marine artists
Postcard artists
Artists from Berlin
19th-century German painters
19th-century German male artists